Aquilegia barbaricina (also called barbaricina columbine) is a species of plant in the family Ranunculaceae. It is endemic to Italy, occurring only on the island of Sardinia.

It is not entirely clear to some taxonomists whether this is a distinct species or a subspecies of some other Sardinian or other Mediterranean island columbine.

Distribution
Its natural habitats are Mediterranean shrubby vegetation and shrub-dominated wetlands.

Endangered
It is almost extinct due to habitat loss and unsustainable collecting. It is an IUCN Red List Critically Endangered plant species and IUCN Top 50 Campaign Mediterranean Island Plant.

References

External links

 
 

barbaricina
Flora of Sardinia
Endemic flora of Italy
Critically endangered plants
Critically endangered biota of Europe
Taxonomy articles created by Polbot
Plants described in 1977